The 1996 United States Senate election in Nebraska was held on November 5, 1996. Incumbent Democratic U.S. Senator J. James Exon decided to retire instead of seeking a fourth term. Republican nominee Chuck Hagel won the open seat by 14 points, defeating incumbent Democratic governor Ben Nelson. Nelson would later be elected to Nebraska's other U.S. Senate seat in 2000 when Bob Kerrey retired and served alongside Hagel until 2009, when Hagel left the Senate after retiring.

Democratic primary

Candidates
 Ben Nelson, Governor of Nebraska

Results

Republican primary

Candidates
 Chuck Hagel, businessman
 Don Stenberg, Attorney General of Nebraska

Results

General election

Candidates
 John DeCamp (L), former State Senator
 Bill Dunn (NL)
 Chuck Hagel (R), businessman
 Ben Nelson (D), Governor of Nebraska

Results

See also 
 1996 United States Senate elections

References 

Nebraska
1996
1996 Nebraska elections